Untersteinach (bei Stadtsteinach) station is a railway station in the municipality of Untersteinach, located in the district of Kulmbach in Middle Franconia, Germany.

References

Railway stations in Bavaria
Buildings and structures in Kulmbach (district)